Sabuj Saathi (সবুজ সাথী) is a 2003 Bengali drama romance film directed by Swapan Saha and produced by Debendra Kuchar. The film features actors Prosenjit Chatterjee and Rachana Banerjee in the lead roles. Music of the film has been composed by Ashok Bhadra.

Plot
Prosenjit Chatterjee as a Sabuj loves a next door girl Rachana Banerjee as a Saathi. But eventually Sathi turns out to be his friend Rahul's lover. Sobuj does everything to protect his friend's (Abhishek Chatterjee) love. He loses his mother and his family. Facing bitter circumstances Rahul learns the lessons of life. He learns to work on his own and take responsibilities. After 2 years Rahul comes back but only to settle his sister's life. Again Sabuj comes to the rescue. He agrees to marry a neural patient to salvage his friend Rahul's love. But destiny played otherwise. Rahul had to marry a girl to salvage her sister's marriage. Sabuj did everything for Sathi but did not tell that he loved her. In the end Sabuj's mother did not tell.

Cast 

 Prosenjit Chatterjee as Sabuj
 Rachana Banerjee as Sathi
 Tapas Paul as DSP Subrata Sanyal
 Abhishek Chatterjee as Rahul, Sabuj's best friend and initially Sathi's love interest
 Laboni Sarkar as Sabuj's Mother
 Dulal Lahiri as Pradip Choudhury, Bikash's father
 Subhasish Mukhopadhyay as Arun, Sabuj's friend
 Lokesh Ghosh as Bikash Choudhury
 Bodhisattwa Majumdar as Sabuj's Father
 Arpita Baker as Bimala, Sathi's Mother 
 Kalyani Mondal as Rahul and Mita's mother
 Moumita Chakraborty as Mita

References

External links
 Sabuj Saathi

2003 films
Bengali-language Indian films
2000s Bengali-language films
Films directed by Swapan Saha
2003 romantic drama films
Indian romantic drama films